Taipei Municipal Neihu Senior High School (NHSH; , Tongyong Pinyin: taibei shihli neihu gaojhong, Hanyu Pinyin: taibei shili neihu gaozhong, Wade–Giles: tai2bei3 shih4li4 nei4hu2 gao1chong1) is a public 3-year high school in Taipei City, Taiwan, Republic of China.

Introduction 
Neihu Senior High School is the first senior high school established after Taipei City was converted into a special municipality under the direct jurisdiction of the central government. Campus construction began in July 1986. The school was completely established on August 1, 1988 and enrolled the first 18 classes of freshmen.

The campus is located near the foot of lush hills, surrounded by crystal-clear lakes, and adorned with green and white schoolhouses.

With the current service of the Wenhu Line (Brown Line) of Taipei Metro, the convenience of transportation will help enrollment growth.

History 
Taipei Municipal Neihu Senior High School (NHSH), also known as “Windy Castle”, is the first high school built after Taiwan's capital (Taipei) was converted into a special municipality under the direct jurisdiction of the central government of Republic of China in Taiwan.  The first principal, Mr Lin, Huei, started to design and construct the classroom buildings in July 1986.  Two years later, on August 1, 1988, the school was completely established and enrolled the first eighteen classes of freshmen.  It currently has  sixty-one classes. The school  attracts students from the Neihu District and the Greater Taipei area.

The second principal, Mr Ye, Wen-Tang, assumed office in August 1996. The current principal, Mr Lin, Shin-Yaw assumed office in August 2001.

Location 
The school is located in the northeast of the Taipei Basin. To its north and south, the premises face lush mountains.  East of the campus is an area dedicated to track and field, with a 300-meter track.  There is also a multi-function activity center.  The south is an indoor 8-lap, 50-meter long, heated swimming pool.  To its west and south is Tzu-Yang Park.

See also 
 Education in Taiwan

References

External links 

 Official website 
 Official website 

1988 establishments in Taiwan
High schools in Taiwan
Educational institutions established in 1988
Municipal Neihu Senior High School